Arun Loganathan (born 1 July 1983) is an Indian mentalist, escape artist and certified master hypnotist. He is the first Indian to win the Medal of Merlin in an International Arena.

Early life 
Arun was born and brought up in Chennai, India. As a small child, he contracted polio.

Career 
He is a lifetime member of the International Magicians Society. He has been performing in various stages for the past 17 years across internationally. He is a qualified law and management graduate.

Recognition
He was the first Indian to win the Medal of Merlin Best Close-up Magic, conducted in Bangkok in 2013. He was the second runner up in Close-up Magic conducted in Bangalore in 2012.

References

1983 births
Living people
Indian magicians
Indian hypnotists